Odigram (also spelled Udigram or Hodigram) is a settlement in the Swat Valley, in the Khyber Pakhtunkhwa province of northern Pakistan. It forms an administrative unit known as Union council or ward in Tehsil Babuzai, of Swat District.

Odigram is territorial ward, which is further divided in three village councils:
 Balogram (Village Council)
 Odigram No. 1 (Village Council)
 Odigram No. 2 (Village Council)

Odigram is the site of the Mahmud Ghaznavi Mosque, one of the oldest in Pakistan.

References

External links
 Book: Hidden Treasures of Swat, 
 Odigram Facebook Page
 Odigram Campus -University of Swat 
 Khyber-Pakhtunkhwa Government website section on Lower Dir
 United Nations
 Hajjinfo.org Uploads
 PBS paiman.jsi.com

Swat District
Populated places in Swat District
Union councils of Khyber Pakhtunkhwa
Union Councils of Swat District